Early general elections were held in Malta between 5 and 7 May 1951. They came less than a year after the previous elections as a result of disagreements in the coalition government formed by the centre-right Nationalist Party and centre-left Malta Workers Party. Although the Malta Labour Party received the most votes, the Nationalist Party remained the largest party, winning 15 of the 40 seats. Despite their previous disagreements, the Nationalist Party and Workers Party formed a new government.

Electoral system
The elections were held using the single transferable vote system.

Results

References

General elections in Malta
General election
Malta
Maltese general election
Maltese general election